Aigars is a Latvian masculine given name and may refer to:
Aigars Apinis (born 1973) Latvian decathlete and Paralympic medalist
Aigars Cipruss (born 1972) Latvian ice hockey player
Aigars Fadejevs (born 1975) Latvian track and field athlete and Olympic medalist
Aigars Jansons (born 1971), Latvian wrestler
Aigars Kalvītis (born 1966), Latvian politician, former Prime Minister of Latvia
Aigars Kriķis (1954–1999), Latvian luger and Olympic medalist
Aigars Kudis (born 1959), Latvian former swimmer
Aigars Nerips (born 1967), Latvian basketball coach
Aigars Prūsis (born 1976), Latvian nationalist politician
Aigars Šķēle (born 1992), Latvian basketball player
Aigars Štokenbergs (born 1963) Latvian politician
Aigars Vītols (born 1976) Latvian basketball player

Latvian masculine given names